This is a list of NCAA Division III men's basketball tournament bids by school, at the start of the 2023 tournament.  As of 2023, there are a total of 64 bids possible.

Division III members 
 Teams in bold are still alive in the 2023 NCAA Division III men's basketball tournament.
 These do not include appearances made by these teams in either the Division I (University Division) or Division II (College Division) tournaments before the establishment of Division III in 1975.
 School names reflect those in current use by their respective athletic programs, not necessarily those used when a school made an appearance in the Division III tournament.

Notes

Teams with no appearances 
Conference alignments are current for the NCAA basketball season of 2022–23.
Allegheny Mountain Collegiate Conference (4) – Alfred State, Hilbert, Mount Aloysius, Penn State Altoona
 Carlow joins in 2023–24 but is not eligible to compete for the national title until 2026–27.
American Southwest Conference (2) – Howard Payne, Ozarks
Atlantic East Conference (2) – Centenary (NJ), Marywood
Centennial Conference (2) – Haverford, McDaniel
Coast to Coast Athletic Conference (4) – Finlandia, Pratt, UC Santa Cruz, Warren Wilson
 Warren Wilson is not eligible to compete for the national title until 2024–25.
Collegiate Conference of the South (4) – Belhaven, Berea, Huntingdon, Piedmont
 The conference is not eligible for a tournament bid until 2024–25.
Colonial States Athletic Conference  (4) – Bryn Athyn, Keystone, Saint Elizabeth (NJ), Valley Forge
 Notre Dame (MD) plans to become co-educational and add men's sports (including basketball) in 2023–24.
Commonwealth Coast Conference (1) – Roger Williams
 Hartford joins in 2023–24 but is not eligible to compete for the national title until 2025–26.
Empire 8 (2) – Houghton, Keuka
Great Northeast Athletic Conference (2) – Dean, Emmanuel (MA)
Heartland Collegiate Athletic Conference (2) – Bluffton, Earlham
Independents (4) – Asbury, Bob Jones, Lyon, Maranatha Baptist
 Bob Jones, Asbury, and Lyon are not eligible to compete for the national title until 2023–24, 2024–25, and 2025–26 respectively.
Landmark Conference (2) – Drew, Juniata
Liberty League (1) – Bard
Michigan Intercollegiate Athletic Association (2) – Olivet, Trine
Minnesota Intercollegiate Athletic Conference (3) – Macalester, Saint Mary's (MN), St. Scholastica
New England Collegiate Conference (2) – Eastern Nazarene, Lesley
New England Women's and Men's Athletic Conference (1) – Wheaton (MA)
New Jersey Athletic Conference (1) – Rutgers–Camden
North Atlantic Conference (5) – Maine Maritime, Maine–Presque Isle, Northern Vermont–Johnson, Northern Vermont–Lyndon, Thomas (ME)
 Eastern Nazarene and Lesley join in 2023–24. Northern Vermont–Johnson leaves the NCAA in 2024–25.
Northern Athletics Collegiate Conference (3) – Concordia Chicago, Dominican (IL), Illinois Tech
Northwest Conference (3) – George Fox, Pacific Lutheran, Willamette
Presidents' Athletic Conference (4) – Franciscan, Geneva, Thiel, Waynesburg
Skyline Conference (3) – St. Joseph's (Brooklyn), Sarah Lawrence, SUNY Maritime
Southern California Intercollegiate Athletic Conference (1) – Caltech
Southern Collegiate Athletic Conference (2) – Austin, Southwestern (TX)
St. Louis Intercollegiate Athletic Conference (2) – MUW, Principia
 Lyon joins in, and MUW is not eligible to compete for the national title until, 2023–24.
State University of New York Athletic Conference (1) – SUNY New Paltz
United East Conference  (4) – Gallaudet, Penn College, Penn State Abington, Penn State Berks
Upper Midwest Athletic Conference (5) – Crown, Martin Luther, North Central (MN), Northland, Wisconsin–Superior
USA South Athletic Conference (5) – Brevard, Mary Baldwin, Pfeiffer, Southern Virginia, William Peace

Notes

Former Division III members

Notes

See also 
NCAA Division III men's basketball tournament
NCAA Division I men's basketball tournament
NCAA Division II men's basketball tournament
NAIA Men's Basketball Championships
NCAA Division I men's basketball tournament bids by school
List of NCAA Division II men's basketball tournament bids by school

References 

Bids by school
NCAA lists
College basketball in the United States lists